The 2001–02 Mighty Ducks of Anaheim season was the Ducks' ninth season in the National Hockey League. For the third straight year, the Mighty Ducks failed to qualify for the playoffs.

Off-season
Bryan Murray was hired as the team’s new head coach on May 25, 2001.

The Ducks only made a few moves that summer after making a lot of roster moves in early 2001 acquiring Keith Carney from Phoenix for a 2001 2nd round Draft pick on June 19, signing defenseman Jason York and enforcer Denny Lambert rejoining the franchise on July 2 for 2002 8th round draft pick.

Regular season
The season after trading Teemu Selanne to the Sharks did not see the Mighty Ducks improve their scoring depth as the team was second to last in the west with 175 goals. Trying to fill this void the scoring of Mike Leclerc and Matt Cullen improved and Jeff Friesen delivered the scoring expected from him, it was not enough. German Titov, while improving could still not live up to the expectations. Marty McInnes rebound season in 2000-2001 had the Mighty Ducks hoping for another 20 goal season but ended up with only 9 goals before getting traded to Boston. After missing almost all of last season, Steve Rucchin missed the first half of this season appearing in only 38 games while still recovering from the face injury he sustained. The Mighty Ducks also heavily struggled on the power play during the regular season, finishing 30th overall in power-play percentage, at 11.53% (43 for 373). Their Defense and Goaltending improved a lot, allowing only 198 goals (245 the season before). Giguere settled in nicely as the new number one winning 20 games while Steve Shields served as a solid backup.

Final standings

Schedule and results

|- align="center" bgcolor="#FFBBBB"
|1||L||October 4, 2001||2–4 || align="left"| @ Boston Bruins ||0–1–0–0 || 
|- align="center" bgcolor="#CCFFCC"
|2||W||October 6, 2001||4–2 || align="left"| @ Pittsburgh Penguins ||1–1–0–0 || 
|- align="center" bgcolor="#FFBBBB"
|3||L||October 8, 2001||1–6 || align="left"| @ Toronto Maple Leafs ||1–2–0–0 || 
|- align="center" bgcolor="#FFBBBB"
|4||L||October 9, 2001||1–3 || align="left"| @ Montreal Canadiens ||1–3–0–0 || 
|- align="center" bgcolor="#CCFFCC"
|5||W||October 12, 2001||2–1 || align="left"| Washington Capitals ||2–3–0–0 || 
|- align="center" bgcolor="#FFBBBB"
|6||L||October 14, 2001||2–3 || align="left"| Tampa Bay Lightning ||2–4–0–0 || 
|- align="center"
|7||T||October 17, 2001||2–2 OT|| align="left"| Boston Bruins ||2–4–1–0 || 
|- align="center" bgcolor="#FFBBBB"
|8||L||October 18, 2001||1–4 || align="left"| @ Los Angeles Kings ||2–5–1–0 || 
|- align="center" bgcolor="#CCFFCC"
|9||W||October 21, 2001||3–1 || align="left"| Vancouver Canucks ||3–5–1–0 || 
|- align="center" bgcolor="#CCFFCC"
|10||W||October 24, 2001||3–2 OT|| align="left"| @ Phoenix Coyotes ||4–5–1–0 || 
|- align="center" bgcolor="#FFBBBB"
|11||L||October 28, 2001||2–3 || align="left"| Colorado Avalanche ||4–6–1–0 || 
|- align="center" bgcolor="#FFBBBB"
|12||L||October 31, 2001||2–4 || align="left"| San Jose Sharks ||4–7–1–0 || 
|-

|- align="center" bgcolor="#CCFFCC"
|13||W||November 2, 2001||5–2 || align="left"| Chicago Blackhawks ||5–7–1–0 || 
|- align="center" bgcolor="#CCFFCC"
|14||W||November 4, 2001||5–0 || align="left"| Atlanta Thrashers ||6–7–1–0 || 
|- align="center"
|15||T||November 7, 2001||3–3 OT|| align="left"| Calgary Flames ||6–7–2–0 || 
|- align="center" bgcolor="#FFBBBB"
|16||L||November 9, 2001||0–1 || align="left"| Detroit Red Wings ||6–8–2–0 || 
|- align="center"
|17||T||November 11, 2001||2–2 OT|| align="left"| Dallas Stars ||6–8–3–0 || 
|- align="center" bgcolor="#FFBBBB"
|18||L||November 14, 2001||2–4 || align="left"| San Jose Sharks ||6–9–3–0 || 
|- align="center" bgcolor="#FFBBBB"
|19||L||November 16, 2001||2–3 || align="left"| @ Columbus Blue Jackets ||6–10–3–0 || 
|- align="center" bgcolor="#FFBBBB"
|20||L||November 17, 2001||1–4 || align="left"| @ Washington Capitals ||6–11–3–0 || 
|- align="center" bgcolor="#FFBBBB"
|21||L||November 20, 2001||2–3 || align="left"| @ Tampa Bay Lightning ||6–12–3–0 || 
|- align="center" bgcolor="#FFBBBB"
|22||L||November 21, 2001||0–6 || align="left"| @ Florida Panthers ||6–13–3–0 || 
|- align="center" bgcolor="#FFBBBB"
|23||L||November 24, 2001||3–5 || align="left"| @ New York Islanders ||6–14–3–0 || 
|- align="center" bgcolor="#CCFFCC"
|24||W||November 25, 2001||3–2 || align="left"| @ New York Rangers ||7–14–3–0 || 
|- align="center" bgcolor="#FFBBBB"
|25||L||November 28, 2001||0–2 || align="left"| Edmonton Oilers ||7–15–3–0 || 
|- align="center" bgcolor="#FFBBBB"
|26||L||November 30, 2001||2–5 || align="left"| San Jose Sharks ||7–16–3–0 || 
|-

|- align="center" bgcolor="#CCFFCC"
|27||W||December 2, 2001||4–2 || align="left"| Nashville Predators ||8–16–3–0 || 
|- align="center" bgcolor="#FF6F6F"
|28||OTL||December 5, 2001||2–3 OT|| align="left"| @ Edmonton Oilers ||8–16–3–1 || 
|- align="center" bgcolor="#FFBBBB"
|29||L||December 6, 2001||2–3 || align="left"| @ Vancouver Canucks ||8–17–3–1 || 
|- align="center" bgcolor="#CCFFCC"
|30||W||December 8, 2001||4–0 || align="left"| @ Calgary Flames ||9–17–3–1 || 
|- align="center"
|31||T||December 10, 2001||1–1 OT|| align="left"| @ Colorado Avalanche ||9–17–4–1 || 
|- align="center" bgcolor="#FF6F6F"
|32||OTL||December 12, 2001||0–1 OT|| align="left"| Vancouver Canucks ||9–17–4–2 || 
|- align="center" bgcolor="#FFBBBB"
|33||L||December 14, 2001||2–3 || align="left"| Columbus Blue Jackets ||9–18–4–2 || 
|- align="center" bgcolor="#FF6F6F"
|34||OTL||December 16, 2001||2–3 OT|| align="left"| Los Angeles Kings ||9–18–4–3 || 
|- align="center" bgcolor="#CCFFCC"
|35||W||December 18, 2001||5–1 || align="left"| @ Minnesota Wild ||10–18–4–3 || 
|- align="center" bgcolor="#FFBBBB"
|36||L||December 19, 2001||1–2 || align="left"| @ Colorado Avalanche ||10–19–4–3 || 
|- align="center" bgcolor="#CCFFCC"
|37||W||December 21, 2001||2–1 || align="left"| Phoenix Coyotes ||11–19–4–3 || 
|- align="center" bgcolor="#CCFFCC"
|38||W||December 23, 2001||4–0 || align="left"| @ Phoenix Coyotes ||12–19–4–3 || 
|- align="center" bgcolor="#CCFFCC"
|39||W||December 26, 2001||2–1 || align="left"| @ San Jose Sharks ||13–19–4–3 || 
|- align="center"
|40||T||December 27, 2001||2–2 OT|| align="left"| @ Los Angeles Kings ||13–19–5–3 || 
|- align="center" bgcolor="#FFBBBB"
|41||L||December 30, 2001||1–2 || align="left"| @ Chicago Blackhawks ||13–20–5–3 || 
|- align="center" bgcolor="#FFBBBB"
|42||L||December 31, 2001||1–3 || align="left"| @ Columbus Blue Jackets ||13–21–5–3 || 
|-

|- align="center" bgcolor="#FFBBBB"
|43||L||January 2, 2002||3–5 || align="left"| @ Detroit Red Wings ||13–22–5–3 || 
|- align="center" bgcolor="#FFBBBB"
|44||L||January 4, 2002||1–2 || align="left"| Florida Panthers ||13–23–5–3 || 
|- align="center" bgcolor="#FFBBBB"
|45||L||January 9, 2002||2–3 || align="left"| St. Louis Blues ||13–24–5–3 || 
|- align="center"
|46||T||January 11, 2002||2–2 OT|| align="left"| @ Minnesota Wild ||13–24–6–3 || 
|- align="center" bgcolor="#FFBBBB"
|47||L||January 12, 2002||1–2 || align="left"| @ Nashville Predators ||13–25–6–3 || 
|- align="center" bgcolor="#CCFFCC"
|48||W||January 14, 2002||5–3 || align="left"| Nashville Predators ||14–25–6–3 || 
|- align="center" bgcolor="#FFBBBB"
|49||L||January 16, 2002||1–3 || align="left"| Buffalo Sabres ||14–26–6–3 || 
|- align="center" bgcolor="#FFBBBB"
|50||L||January 18, 2002||1–3 || align="left"| @ Edmonton Oilers ||14–27–6–3 || 
|- align="center" bgcolor="#FFBBBB"
|51||L||January 19, 2002||1–2 || align="left"| @ Calgary Flames ||14–28–6–3 || 
|- align="center" bgcolor="#FFBBBB"
|52||L||January 21, 2002||2–4 || align="left"| Los Angeles Kings ||14–29–6–3 || 
|- align="center" bgcolor="#CCFFCC"
|53||W||January 23, 2002||3–2 OT|| align="left"| Minnesota Wild ||15–29–6–3 || 
|- align="center" bgcolor="#CCFFCC"
|54||W||January 25, 2002||6–1 || align="left"| @ Dallas Stars ||16–29–6–3 || 
|- align="center" bgcolor="#CCFFCC"
|55||W||January 26, 2002||3–1 || align="left"| @ Nashville Predators ||17–29–6–3 || 
|- align="center" bgcolor="#CCFFCC"
|56||W||January 28, 2002||1–0 || align="left"| @ St. Louis Blues ||18–29–6–3 || 
|- align="center" bgcolor="#CCFFCC"
|57||W||January 30, 2002||3–1 || align="left"| Columbus Blue Jackets ||19–29–6–3 || 
|-

|- align="center" bgcolor="#CCFFCC"
|58||W||February 6, 2002||5–4 || align="left"| Philadelphia Flyers ||20–29–6–3 || 
|- align="center" bgcolor="#FFBBBB"
|59||L||February 8, 2002||1–4 || align="left"| Carolina Hurricanes ||20–30–6–3 || 
|- align="center" bgcolor="#FFBBBB"
|60||L||February 10, 2002||1–5 || align="left"| Dallas Stars ||20–31–6–3 || 
|- align="center" bgcolor="#CCFFCC"
|61||W||February 13, 2002||3–2 || align="left"| Calgary Flames ||21–31–6–3 || 
|- align="center" bgcolor="#FFBBBB"
|62||L||February 27, 2002||3–5 || align="left"| Minnesota Wild ||21–32–6–3 || 
|-

|- align="center" bgcolor="#FFBBBB"
|63||L||March 3, 2002||1–2 || align="left"| @ Chicago Blackhawks ||21–33–6–3 || 
|- align="center" bgcolor="#CCFFCC"
|64||W||March 6, 2002||4–1 || align="left"| @ Atlanta Thrashers ||22–33–6–3 || 
|- align="center" bgcolor="#CCFFCC"
|65||W||March 8, 2002||2–1 || align="left"| New Jersey Devils ||23–33–6–3 || 
|- align="center" bgcolor="#FFBBBB"
|66||L||March 10, 2002||2–4 || align="left"| Ottawa Senators ||23–34–6–3 || 
|- align="center" bgcolor="#CCFFCC"
|67||W||March 13, 2002||4–2 || align="left"| Pittsburgh Penguins ||24–34–6–3 || 
|- align="center"
|68||T||March 15, 2002||1–1 OT|| align="left"| Chicago Blackhawks ||24–34–7–3 || 
|- align="center" bgcolor="#FFBBBB"
|69||L||March 17, 2002||2–3 || align="left"| St. Louis Blues ||24–35–7–3 || 
|- align="center" bgcolor="#CCFFCC"
|70||W||March 19, 2002||2–1 || align="left"| @ Detroit Red Wings ||25–35–7–3 || 
|- align="center" bgcolor="#FFBBBB"
|71||L||March 21, 2002||1–2 || align="left"| @ Philadelphia Flyers ||25–36–7–3 || 
|- align="center" bgcolor="#FFBBBB"
|72||L||March 22, 2002||2–3 || align="left"| @ St. Louis Blues ||25–37–7–3 || 
|- align="center" bgcolor="#CCFFCC"
|73||W||March 24, 2002||2–1 || align="left"| @ Dallas Stars ||26–37–7–3 || 
|- align="center" bgcolor="#FFBBBB"
|74||L||March 27, 2002||2–4 || align="left"| Phoenix Coyotes ||26–38–7–3 || 
|- align="center" bgcolor="#CCFFCC"
|75||W||March 28, 2002||2–1 OT|| align="left"| @ Phoenix Coyotes ||27–38–7–3 || 
|- align="center" bgcolor="#FFBBBB"
|76||L||March 30, 2002||1–4 || align="left"| @ Vancouver Canucks ||27–39–7–3 || 
|-

|- align="center" bgcolor="#FFBBBB"
|77||L||April 2, 2002||1–3 || align="left"| @ San Jose Sharks ||27–40–7–3 || 
|- align="center"
|78||T||April 3, 2002||1–1 OT|| align="left"| Detroit Red Wings ||27–40–8–3 || 
|- align="center" bgcolor="#CCFFCC"
|79||W||April 5, 2002||2–0 || align="left"| Edmonton Oilers ||28–40–8–3 || 
|- align="center" bgcolor="#CCFFCC"
|80||W||April 7, 2002||4–1 || align="left"| Dallas Stars ||29–40–8–3 || 
|- align="center" bgcolor="#FFBBBB"
|81||L||April 12, 2002||1–3 || align="left"| Colorado Avalanche ||29–41–8–3 || 
|- align="center" bgcolor="#FFBBBB"
|82||L||April 14, 2002||0–1 || align="left"| @ Los Angeles Kings ||29–42–8–3 || 

|-
| Legend:

Player statistics

Scoring
 Position abbreviations: C = Center; D = Defense; G = Goaltender; LW = Left Wing; RW = Right Wing
  = Joined team via a transaction (e.g., trade, waivers, signing) during the season. Stats reflect time with the Mighty Ducks only.
  = Left team via a transaction (e.g., trade, waivers, release) during the season. Stats reflect time with the Mighty Ducks only.

Goaltending

Awards and records
 Paul Kariya, Olympic Gold Medal, ice hockey

Transactions
The Mighty Ducks were involved in the following transactions from June 10, 2001, the day after the deciding game of the 2001 Stanley Cup Finals, through June 13, 2002, the day of the deciding game of the 2002 Stanley Cup Finals.

Trades

Players acquired

Players lost

Signings

Draft picks
Anaheim's draft picks at the 2001 NHL Entry Draft held at the National Car Rental Center in Sunrise, Florida.

Farm teams
 The Mighty Ducks farm team was the Cincinnati Mighty Ducks of the American Hockey League. The team finished third in the Central Division with a record of 32-33-11-3. The club had 216 goals scored for and 211 goals scored against. The team lost 2 games to 1 to the Chicago Wolves in the postseason.

See also
2001–02 NHL season

Notes

References

Anaheim Ducks seasons
Anaheim
Anaheim
Mighty Ducks of Anaheim
Mighty Ducks of Anaheim